Events from the year 1955 in the United Kingdom. The year is marked by changes of leadership for both principal political parties.

Incumbents
 Monarch – Elizabeth II
 Prime Minister -  Winston Churchill (Conservative) (until 6 April), Anthony Eden (Conservative) (starting 6 April)
 Parliament
 40th (until 6 May)
 41st (starting 7 June)

Events
 1 January – the U.K's first atomic bomber unit, No. 138 Squadron RAF, is formed, flying Vickers Valiants from RAF Gaydon in Warwickshire.
 7 January – U.K. release of the Halas and Batchelor film animation of George Orwell's Animal Farm (completed April 1954), the first full-length British-made animated feature on general theatrical release.
 23 January – Sutton Coldfield rail crash: an express train takes a sharp curve too fast and derails at Sutton Coldfield railway station: 17 killed, 43 injured.
 27 January – Michael Tippett's opera The Midsummer Marriage is premiered at the Royal Opera House, Covent Garden in London, with designs by Barbara Hepworth and choreography by John Cranko; it arouses controversy.
 24 February – a big freeze across Britain results in more than 70 roads being blocked with snow, and in some parts of the country rail services are cancelled for several days. The Royal Air Force works to deliver food and medical supplies to the worst affected areas.
 25 February – aircraft carrier HMS Ark Royal (launched 1950) commissioned, the first constructed with an angled flight deck and steam catapults from new.
 1 April – EOKA starts a terrorist campaign against British rule in the Crown colony of Cyprus, leading to a state of emergency being declared by the Governor on 26 November.
 2 April – Duncan Edwards, the 18-year-old Manchester United left-half, becomes the youngest full England international in a 7–2 win over Scotland at Wembley. Dudley-born Edwards is already being tipped by many observers to become the next England captain upon the eventual retirement of Billy Wright.
 5 April – Winston Churchill resigns as Prime Minister due to ill-health at the age of 80.
 6 April – Foreign Secretary Anthony Eden is named as the new Prime Minister. Eden, 58, has held government and shadow cabinet ministerial roles for the last 20 years, and was first tipped for the role of prime minister as long ago as Stanley Baldwin's resignation. Eden's previous office of Deputy Prime Minister is not refilled.
 16 April – release of Laurence Olivier's film Richard III.
 21 April – national newspapers published for the first time after a month-long strike by maintenance workers.
 23 April – Chelsea F.C., who have previously never won the league title nor the FA Cup, are Football League First Division champions, and will be England's first entrants into UEFA's new European Cup next season if they accept the invitation to compete.
 30 April – Pietro Annigoni's portrait of the Queen is unveiled.
 1 May – the last Cornish engine pumping in the metalliferous mines of Cornwall is shut down at South Crofty.
 4–6 May – a severe gale strips topsoil across Norfolk.
 5 May – American virologist Dr Jonas Salk promotes a polio vaccine in Britain, with the 500,000th person receiving a vaccine against the disease.
 7 May – Newcastle United secure the FA Cup for the sixth time with a 3-1 win over Manchester City at Wembley Stadium.
 14 May – Warrington win the Rugby League Championship title for the third time; they will not win it again within the following 60 years.
 24 May
 Film The Dam Busters released.
 With three days to go before the general election, all major opinion polls show the Conservative government well placed for re-election.
 25 May – Joe Brown and George Band are the first to attain the summit of Kanchenjunga, as part of a British team led by Charles Evans.
 27 May – Anthony Eden wins the general election for the Conservative Party with a majority of 31 seats, an improvement on the 17-seat majority gained by his predecessor Sir Winston Churchill four years ago. Between them the Conservative and Labour parties take 96.1% of the popular vote. Notable newcomers to the Conservative benches in the House of Commons include William Whitelaw and Geoffrey Rippon.
 29 May – Associated Society of Locomotive Engineers and Firemen (ASLEF) calls a strike on British Railways which continues until 14 June, leading to a state of emergency being declared on 31 May.
 6 June – Children and Young Persons (Harmful Publications) Act comes into effect, with intention of protecting children from horror comics.
 16 June – submarine HMS Sidon sinks in Portland Harbour with the loss of thirteen crew following an explosion caused by a faulty torpedo on board.
 30 June – a Gloster Meteor jet fighter crashes on takeoff from RAF West Malling in Kent, killing both crew and two fruit-pickers on the ground. On the same day, two Hawker Sea Hawk jet fighters flying from RNAS Lossiemouth in Scotland independently crash into the North Sea; one pilot is killed.
 Summer – heat wave and associated drought.
 July – unemployment stands at a modern low of just over 215,000, meaning that barely 1% of the workforce is currently without a job.
 9 July
 Bertrand Russell issues the Russell-Einstein Manifesto highlighting the dangers posed by nuclear weapons.
 Police procedural Dixon of Dock Green, starring Jack Warner, premieres on the BBC Television Service; it will run for 21 years.
 13 July – Ruth Ellis becomes the last woman to be hanged in the UK, at HM Prison Holloway, for shooting dead a lover, David Blakely, outside a pub in Hampstead (north London) on 10 April (Easter Sunday).
 17 July – Stirling Moss becomes the first English winner of the British Grand Prix at Aintree Motor Racing Circuit.
 18 July – Winterborne St Martin (in Dorset) enters the UK Weather Records with the highest 24-hour total rainfall at 279 mm.
 26 July – Chelsea F.C. withdraws from the new European Cup on the instructions of the Football League.
 30 July – Philip Larkin makes a train journey from Hull to Grantham which inspires his poem The Whitsun Weddings.
 3 August
 Ministry of Housing and Local Government issues Circular 42/55 inviting local planning authorities to establish green belts.
 English language premiere of Samuel Beckett's play Waiting for Godot, directed by Peter Hall, opens at the Arts Theatre, London.
 26 August – Hammer Film Productions' The Quatermass Xperiment released.
 27 August – Guinness Book of Records first published.
 29 August – a Royal Air Force English Electric Canberra jet engined medium bomber sets a new world altitude record of 65,876 ft (20,079 m).
 4 September – Richard Baker and Kenneth Kendall become the first BBC Television newsreaders to be seen reading the news.
 7 September – Meld wins the Fillies Triple Crown having finished first in the 1,000 Guineas Stakes, Epsom Oaks and St. Leger Stakes.
 14 September – Airfix produce their first scale model aircraft kit, of the Supermarine Spitfire at 1/72 scale.
 18 September
 The People newspaper makes public that Guy Burgess and Donald Maclean, who defected to the Soviet Union in 1951, were spies and not merely diplomats as previously reported.
 United Kingdom annexes Rockall.
 22 September – the Independent Television Authority's first ITV franchise begins broadcasting the UK's first commercial television in London ending the 18-year monopoly of the BBC. The first advertisement shown is for Gibbs SR toothpaste. On the same day, the popular BBC Radio serial The Archers kills off the character Grace Archer.
 26 September – Clarence Birdseye begins selling fish fingers in Britain.
 October – Dame Evelyn Sharp appointed Permanent Secretary at the Ministry of Housing and Local Government, the first woman Civil Servant to attain this most senior position within a UK Ministry.
 23 October – Kim Philby is named as the "Third Man" of the Cambridge Spy Ring in the U.S. press, a claim repeated on 25 October in the House of Commons by Marcus Lipton.
 31 October – Princess Margaret announces that she does not intend to marry divorced Group Captain Peter Townsend.
 7 November – the Foreign Secretary denies in Parliament that Kim Philby is the "Third Man" of the Cambridge Spy Ring.
 19 November – C. Northcote Parkinson first articulates "Parkinson's Law", the semi-serious adage Work expands so as to fill the time available for its completion.
 20 November – Milton rail crash: an excursion train takes a crossover too fast and derails at Milton, near Didcot: 11 killed, 157 injured.
 Late November – Lonnie Donegan's 1954 skiffle recording of Rock Island Line is released as a single: it becomes a major hit in 1956.
 2 December – Barnes rail crash, Barnes, South London: collision due to signal error and consequent fire: 13 killed, 35 injured.
 7 December – Clement Attlee resigns as leader of the Labour Party after twenty years at the age of 72.
 8 December – Ealing comedy film The Ladykillers released.
 9 December – Cumbernauld, Scotland, designated as a New town.
 12 December – Christopher Cockerell patents his design of hovercraft.
 14 December – Hugh Gaitskell becomes leader of the Labour Party. The 49-year-old MP was previously the treasurer of the party and served as chancellor during the final year of the previous Labour government.
 16 December – the Queen opens a new terminal at London Airport.
 20 December – Cardiff becomes the official capital of Wales.

Publications
 Kingsley Amis's comic novel That Uncertain Feeling.
 Derrick Sherwin Bailey's study Homosexuality and the Western Christian Tradition.
 Henry Cecil's comic novel Brothers in Law.
 Agatha Christie's Hercule Poirot novel Hickory Dickory Dock.
 G. R. Elton's history England Under the Tudors.
 Ian Fleming's James Bond novel Moonraker.
 Graham Greene's novel The Quiet American.
 W. G. Hoskins' historical geography The Making of the English Landscape.
 Aldous Huxley's novel The Genius and the Goddess.
 Philip Larkin's poetry collection The Less Deceived.
 C. S. Lewis' high fantasy Narnia novel The Magician's Nephew and spiritual autobiography Surprised by Joy.
 Alistair MacLean's adventure novel HMS Ulysses.
 J. J. Marric's police procedural novel Gideon's Day.
 Ian Nairn's special issue of Architectural Review, "Outrage".
 J. R. R. Tolkien's high fantasy novel The Return of the King, third of The Lord of the Rings trilogy.
 Alfred Wainwright's first hand-drawn guidebook A Pictorial Guide to the Lakeland Fells, Book 1: The Eastern Fells.
 Evelyn Waugh's novel Officers and Gentlemen, second of the Sword of Honour trilogy.
 Donald J. West's study Homosexuality.
 John Wyndham's science fiction novel The Chrysalids.

Births

January–June
 1 January 
Mary Beard, classicist
Simon Schaffer, academic and historian of science and philosophy
 3 January – Helen O'Hara, rock violinist
 5 January – Jimmy Mulville, comedian, actor, producer and screenwriter, co-founder of Hat Trick Productions
 6 January – Rowan Atkinson, comedian and actor
 15 January – Nigel Benson, author and illustrator
 18 January – Lionel Barber, journalist
 19 January
Tony Mansfield, singer-songwriter and producer 
Simon Rattle, orchestral conductor
 27 January – Alexander Stuart, novelist and screenwriter in the United States
 3 February
 Sue Ion, born Susan Burrows, nuclear scientist
 Kirsty Wark, Scottish television presenter
 5 February – Melanie Johnson, British politician
 9 February – Charles Shaughnessy, television actor in the United States and peer
 10 February – Chris Adams, wrestler (died 2001)
 18 February – Miles Tredinnick, singer-songwriter and playwright 
 23 February – Howard Jones, pop keyboardist and singer-songwriter
 28 February – Bob Kerslake, head of the home civil service
 1 March – Timothy Laurence, admiral and second husband of Anne, Princess Royal
 11 March – Peter Bennett-Jones, television producer
 19 March – John Burnside, Scottish poet and fiction writer
 28 March – John Alderdice, Alliance Party of Northern Ireland politician and Speaker of the Northern Ireland Assembly
 29 March – Marina Sirtis, television actress in the United States
 31 March – Angus Young, Scottish-born Australian guitarist
 1 April – Sal Brinton, politician
 3 April – Michael Burleigh, historian
 5 April – Janice Long, born Janice Chegwin, radio disc jockey (died 2021)
 10 April – Lesley Garrett, soprano
 11 April – Piers Sellers, English-born meteorologist and astronaut (died 2016)
 17 April – Pete Shelley, rock singer, songwriter and guitarist, co-founder of Buzzcocks (died 2018)
 22 April – Geoffrey Vos, judge, Master of the Rolls
 23 April – Tony Miles, chess player (died 2001)
 24 April – Margaret Moran, Labour politician and convicted criminal
 25 April – John Nunn, chess player and mathematician
 28 April – Eddie Jobson, rock keyboardist and violinist
 1 May – Nick Feldman, rock musician
 2 May – Willie Miller, Scottish footballer
 6 May – John Hutton, Labour politician
 11 May – Paul Rowen, Liberal Democrat politician and MP for Rochdale
 13 May – Garry Bushell, newspaper columnist, rock music journalist and singer, television presenter, writer and political activist
 16 May – Hazel O'Connor, singer
 21 May – Paul Barber, field hockey player
 22 May – Dale Winton, broadcast presenter (died 2018)
 30 May – Topper Headon, born Nicholas Headon, rock drummer (The Clash)
 31 May
 Joe Longthorne, entertainer (died 2019)
 Lynne Truss, writer
 4 June – Val McDermid, Scottish crime novelist
 7 June – Jo Gilbert, film producer and casting director (died 2018)
 8 June – Tim Berners-Lee, inventor of the World Wide Web
 13 June – Alan Hansen, Scottish footballer and television presenter
 14 June
 Gillian Bailey, child actress
 Paul O'Grady, talk show host and comedian
 12 June – Pamela Rooke, model and actress (died 2022)
 26 June
 Mick Jones, rock guitarist (The Clash)
 Steve Whitaker, artist (died 2008)

July–December
 6 July – Michael Boyd, theatre director
 12 July – Timothy Garton Ash, modern historian
 18 July – Terry Chambers, rock drummer
 20 July – Jem Finer, folk rock banjoist, composer and multimedia artist
 21 July – Henry Priestman, English pop singer-songwriter, keyboardist and producer
 29 July – Stephen Timms, Labour politician
 6 August – Gordon J. Brand, golfer
 14 August – Gillian Taylforth, television actress
 23 August – David Learner, actor 
 1 September – Bruce Foxton, rock bass guitarist and vocalist
 3 September – Steve Jones, guitarist (Sex Pistols)
 5 September – John Bentley, rugby football player
 16 September – Janet Ellis, children's television presenter
 20 September – David Haig, actor
 2 October
 Philip Oakey, pop singer-songwriter
 Nancy Rothwell, physiologist
 7 October – Clinton Bennett, scholar of religions, specialist in the study of Islam
 9 October – Steve Ovett, athlete
 18 October – Timmy Mallett, television presenter
 28 October – Digby Jones, businessman
 29 October – Roger O'Donnell, rock keyboardist
 30 October – Jeremy Black, historian
 12 November –  Les McKeown, singer (Bay City Rollers) (died 2021)
 14 November – Philip Egan, bishop
 17 November
 Peter Cox, pop singer-songwriter
 Amanda Levete, architect
 22 November – George Alagiah, Ceylonese-born British newsreader, journalist and television news presenter
 24 November – Ian Botham, cricketer
 30 November – Billy Idol, born William Broad, rock singer
 4 December – Philip Hammond, Chancellor of the Exchequer
 6 December – Edward Tudor-Pole, actor
 13 December – Glenn Roeder, football player and manager (died 2021)
 15 December – Paul Simonon, rock bass guitarist (The Clash)
 23 December – Carol Ann Duffy, Scottish poet

Undated
 Rebecca Salter, printmaker and multimedia abstract artist, President of the Royal Academy
 Phil Sawdon, artist, writer and academic

Deaths
7 January – Lamorna Birch, painter (born 1869)
10 January – Annette Mills, television presenter (born 1894)
29 January – Sir Rhys Rhys-Williams, Welsh politician (born 1865)
11 March – Sir Alexander Fleming, Scottish bacteriologist, recipient of the Nobel Prize in Physiology or Medicine (born 1881)
16 April – Frank Halford, aeronautical engineer (born 1894)
22 April – Herbert MacNair, Scottish artist (born 1868)
27 April – Ambrose Bebb, author (born 1894)
9 May – Kate Booth, Salvation Army officer (born 1858)
11 May – Gilbert Jessop, cricketer (born 1874)
5 June – Sir Herbert Stanley, Governor of Northern Rhodesia, Ceylon and Southern Rhodesia (born 1872)
14 June – Jacob Moritz Blumberg, surgeon, gynaecologist and radium therapist (born 1873 in Germany)
3 July – Beatrice Chase, writer (born 1874)
9 July – Don Beauman, racing driver (born 1928)
13 July – Ruth Ellis, Welsh-born murderer (born 1926)
18 July – Billy McCandless, Irish footballer (born 1894)
16 September – Leo Amery, politician (born 1873)
28 September – Lionel Rees, Welsh airman, Victoria Cross recipient (born 1884)
11 October – Hector McNeil, Scottish politician (born 1907)
14 October – Harry Parr-Davies, Welsh songwriter (born 1914)
15 October – Thomas Jones (T. J.), Welsh educationalist (born 1870)
14 November – Ruby M. Ayres, romance novelist (born 1881)
25 November – Sir Arthur Tansley, botanist and ecologist (born 1871)
27 December – Alfred Carpenter, naval officer, Victoria Cross recipient (born 1881)
31 December – Cyril Garbett, Anglican prelate, Archbishop of York (born 1875)

Notes

See also
 1955 in British music
 1955 in British television
 List of British films of 1955

References

 
Years of the 20th century in the United Kingdom